Mikumi is a town in the Morogoro Region of Tanzania, adjacent to Mikumi National Park. It is at the crossroads to the Great Ruaha River valley and Kilombero sugar factory, and the southern highland regions of Iringa and Mbeya. It is near the larger town of Kidodi.  Kidodi is near a railway station and junction of the Tanzania Railway Corporation.

See also 
 Transport in Tanzania
 Railway stations in Tanzania
 Mikumi National Park

References 

Populated places in Morogoro Region